Solar Photovoltaic Energy Research, Development, and Demonstration Act of 1978 is a United States statute authorizing the research and development of photovoltaic systems utilizing solar energy or sunlight as a source for electricity generation. The Act of Congress promotes energy conservation by the displacement of conventional energy systems dependent upon alternative fuel and fossil fuel resources.

The H.R. 12874 legislation was passed by the 95th U.S. Congressional session and enacted into law by the 39th President of the United States Jimmy Carter on November 4, 1978.

Provisions of the Act
Title 42 United States Code Chapter 71 and Subchapter III was compiled as fourteen code of law sections based on U.S. Congressional findings regarding potential benefits of solar power and declaration of a renewable energy policy.

42 U.S.C. § 5581 - Congressional findings and declaration of policy 
42 U.S.C. § 5582 - Definitions 
42 U.S.C. § 5583 - Establishment and promotion of research, development, and demonstration programs
42 U.S.C. § 5584 - Federal assistance application procedures; selection of applicants; agreements; financial assistance; observation and monitoring of photovoltaic systems; reports; projects and activities
42 U.S.C. § 5585 - Contracts, grants and arrangements
42 U.S.C. § 5586 - Test procedures and performance criteria 
42 U.S.C. § 5587 - Supervision of research, development, and demonstration programs
42 U.S.C. § 5588 - Solar Photovoltaic Energy Advisory Committee 
42 U.S.C. § 5589 - Promotion and facilitation of practical use of photovoltaic energy
42 U.S.C. § 5590 - Submittal to Congressional committees of plan for demonstrating applications of photovoltaic systems and facilitating use in other nations; encouragement of international participation and cooperation; coordination and consistency of plan and international activities with similar activities and programs
42 U.S.C. § 5591 - Participation of small business concerns 
42 U.S.C. § 5592 - Priorities
42 U.S.C. § 5593 - Construction with National Energy Conservation Policy Act 
42 U.S.C. § 5594 - Authorization of appropriations

See also
Energy conservation in the United States
Growth of photovoltaics
National Energy Conservation Policy Act
Renewable energy in the United States
Solar cell
Solar power in the United States
Timeline of solar cells

References

External links
 
 
 
 
 

1978 in law
1978 in American law
95th United States Congress
United States federal energy legislation
Electric power in the United States
Solar power in the United States
Presidency of Jimmy Carter
1978 in the United States